Tioclomarol is an anticoagulant of the 4-hydroxycoumarin vitamin K antagonist type. It is a second generation drug, used as a rodenticide that is effective for the control of rodents that are resistant to this class of drugs.

References

Thiophenes
Chlorobenzenes
Coumarin drugs
Vitamin K antagonists